The 1999 Women's European Water Polo Championship was the eighth edition of the bi-annual event, organised by the Europe's governing body in aquatics, the Ligue Européenne de Natation. The event took place in Prato, Italy from September 4 to September 11, 1999.

Teams

Group A
 
 

 

Group B

Preliminary round

Group A

Saturday September 4, 1999 

Sunday September 5, 1999 

Monday September 6, 1999

Group B

Saturday September 4, 1999 

Sunday September 5, 1999 

Monday September 6, 1999

Quarterfinals
Wednesday September 8, 1999

Semifinals
Thursday September 9, 1999

Finals
Wednesday September 8, 1999 — Seventh place

Thursday September 9, 1999 — Fifth place

Friday September 10, 1999 — Bronze Medal

Friday September 10, 1999 — Gold Medal

Final ranking

Individual awards
Most Valuable Player
???
Best Goalkeeper
???
Best Scorer
Karin Kuipers (NED)

References
  Results

Women
1999
International water polo competitions hosted by Italy
Women's water polo in Italy
European Championship
Water polo
1999 in Italian women's sport